The Proserpine shiner (Cyprinella proserpina) is a species of ray-finned fish in the family Cyprinidae.
It is found in Mexico and the United States.
Its natural habitat is rivers.

References

Cyprinella
Taxa named by Charles Frédéric Girard
Fish described in 1856
Taxonomy articles created by Polbot